Tokyo Live may refer to:

 Tokyo Live (Al Green album), 1981
 Tokyo Live (John McLaughlin album), 1994